Events from the year 1818 in the United Kingdom.

Incumbents
 Monarch – George III
 Regent – George, Prince Regent
 Prime Minister – Robert Jenkinson, 2nd Earl of Liverpool (Tory)
 Foreign Secretary – Robert Stewart, Viscount Castlereagh
 Parliament – 5th (until 10 June), 6th (starting 4 August)

Events
 2 January – Institution of Civil Engineers founded.
 6 January – Treaty of Mundosir annexes Indore and the Rajput states to Britain.
 3 February – Jeremiah Chubb is granted a patent for the Chubb detector lock.
 11 February – Marie André Cantillon attempts to assassinate the Duke of Wellington in Paris.
 16 April – Court of King's Bench decides the case of Ashford v Thornton, upholding the right of the defendant, on a private appeal from an acquittal for murder, to trial by battle. Four days later, the plaintiff declines to fight.
 11 May – the Old Vic is founded as the Royal Coburg Theatre in South London by James King, Daniel Dunn and John T. Serres.
 30 May – Church Building Act makes available £1 million for the construction of new Anglican "Commissioners' churches" to serve the expanding urban population.
 23 July – the Crown agrees sale of its rights in the royal forest of Exmoor. Thomas Dyke Acland secures a herd of Exmoor ponies, the nucleus of the modern breed.
 25 September – Dr James Blundell carries out the first blood transfusion using human blood, in London.
 20 October – a convention between the United States and the United Kingdom establishes the northern boundary of the former as the forty-ninth parallel from the Lake of the Woods to the Rocky Mountains, also creating the Northwest Angle.
 Undated – Besses o' th' Barn brass band is formed at Whitefield in the Manchester cotton district.

Publications
 Jane Austen's novels Northanger Abbey and Persuasion (posthumous; actually issued in December 1817).
 John Evelyn's Diary (posthumous).
 John Keats' poem Endymion (4 vols.)
 Thomas Love Peacock's novel Nightmare Abbey (anonymous).
 Walter Scott's novel The Heart of Midlothian (as by 'Jedediah Cleishbotham').
 Thomas Bowdler's expurgated The Family Shakspeare, 2nd edn.
 Mary Shelley's novel Frankenstein (anonymous).
 Percy Bysshe Shelley's poems "Ozymandias" (published as by 'Glirastes' in The Examiner 11 January) and The Revolt of Islam (actually issued in December 1817).
 Mary Martha Sherwood's children's novel The History of the Fairchild Family (vol. 1; anonymous).

Births
 2 January – Priscilla Horton, contralto, dancer and actress-manager (died 1895)
 18 January – George Palmer, biscuit manufacturer (died 1897)
 24 January – John Mason Neale, Anglican priest, scholar and hymnwriter (died 1866)
 28 January – Alfred Stevens, sculptor (died 1875)
 14 February – Emperor Norton, eccentric (died 1880 in the United States)
 21 February – George Wilson, chemist (died 1859)
 10 March – William Menelaus, mechanical engineer (died 1882)
 22 March – John Ainsworth Horrocks, explorer of South Australia (died 1846)
 19 April – Sir Arthur Elton, 7th Baronet, Liberal politician and writer (died 1883)
 23 April – James Anthony Froude, religious controversialist and historian (died 1894)
 1 May – Lyon Playfair, chemist and Liberal politician (died 1898)
 11 June – Alexander Bain, philosopher and educationalist (died 1903)
 20 June – Eugenius Birch, civil engineer specialising in seaside pleasure piers (died 1884)
 21 June – Richard Wallace, francophile art collector and philanthropist (died 1890)
 11 July – William Edward Forster, Liberal politician (died 1886)
 22 July – Thomas Stevenson, lighthouse designer and meteorologist (died 1887)
 30 July – Emily Brontë, novelist and poet (died 1848)
 3 October – Alexander Macmillan, publisher (died 1896)
 7 December – John Blackwood, publisher (died 1879)
 24 December
 Eliza Cook, writer, poet and radical campaigner (died 1889)
 James Prescott Joule, physicist (died 1889)

Deaths
 6 March – John Gifford, loyalist political writer (born 1758)
 24 March – Humphry Repton, garden designer (born 1752)
 14 or 16 May – Matthew "Monk" Lewis, Gothic writer (born 1775)
 11 August – Robert Carr Brackenbury, Methodist preacher (born 1752)
 22 August – Warren Hastings, Governor-General of India (born 1732)
 1 September – Robert Calder, admiral (born 1745)
 9 September – Seymour Fleming, noblewoman of scandalous reputation, in France (born 1758)  
 17 November – Charlotte of Mecklenburg-Strelitz, Queen consort of the United Kingdom, wife of George III (born 1744)

See also
 1818 in Scotland

References

 
Years of the 19th century in the United Kingdom